The women's high jump at the 2012 European Athletics Championships was held at the Helsinki Olympic Stadium on 27 and 28 June.

Medalists

Records

Schedule

Results

Qualification
Qualification: Qualification Performance 1.92 (Q) or at least 12 best performers advance to the final

Final

References

Qualification Results
Final Results

High jump
High jump at the European Athletics Championships
2012 in women's athletics